The 2022 World Draughts Championship match was held from January 5 to January 20, 2022, at High Tech Campus Eindhoven, in the Netherlands. It was held under the auspices of the International Draughts Federation (FMJD) and played between the reigning 2021 world champion Alexander Schwartzman and 2018 world champion Roel Boomstra.

Boomstra won the match to capture his third world championship title.

Rules and regulations
The event was played over 12 games with a time control of 80 minutes plus 1 minute per move. The player who had the highest score won the world title if he won at least three games. If not, the match continued until one of the players reached a third victory in total, with 3 rapid games 20 minutes plus 10 seconds Fischer system, 3 blitz games with a time schedule of 10 minutes and 5 seconds Fischer system, and a Superblitz (limited time for unlimited number of games till 1st victory) tie breaks with a time schedule of 10 minutes and 2 seconds per move Fischer system.

Per regulations, a preliminary tie-breaking games were to be played if the first six games ended in a draw.

Schedule

Results

Regular games

First tie-break

Second tie-break

See also
 Draughts World Championship

References

External links
 2022 World Draughts Championship match

Draughts world championships
Draughts
2022 in draughts
International sports competitions hosted by the Netherlands
Sports competitions in Eindhoven
World Draughts Championship